Catherine Anne Kelley (born September 27, 1988) is an American journalist, television host, model, and actress, currently signed to WWE, working as a backstage interviewer on the RAW brand. She is also  known for her previous tenure with WWE from 2016 to 2020. Prior to signing with WWE, she was a panelist on Maria Menounos' online network AfterBuzz TV. On October 6, 2022, WWE announced that Cathy Kelley has officially joined the RAW brand as a backstage interviewer after a hiatus of 2 years from the company.

Early life and education 
Catherine Anne Kelley was born on September 27, 1988 in Oak Park, Illinois. She is of Austrian and Irish descent. She grew up with a single mother, but spent much of her time on her father's farm in Vermont. Her grandfather, Bartram Kelley was an aviation pioneer, as the senior engineer of Bell Helicopters.

Kelley became interested in journalism when she was in high school, and started hosting for several of her school's news broadcasts. She graduated from Loyola University Chicago with a degree in multimedia journalism. She is a member of Mensa International, the world's largest and oldest high IQ society, and is also a certified Mensa journalist.

Career

2008–2012: Early work 
Kelley has hosted and contributed to WTTW's GenYTV, WOI-DT's The Open House Television Show, DSM Living, and JUCE TV's Hot Off The Press.

2012–2016: AfterBuzz TV 
Kelley joined AfterBuzz TV in 2012. She was a panelist on the networks' recap shows of WWE's Monday Night Raw, NXT, and ABC's The Bachelor  In 2013, she began hosting a podcast called "Chatting with Cathy," where she interviewed celebrities, social influencers, and friends of the network.

2016–2020: WWE 
Kelley was signed to WWE in February 2016, and was a correspondent for NXT and special events. She made her official WWE debut on April 1, 2016, on the pre-show of NXT Takeover: Dallas. During her tenure, she hosted WWE Now, a show that airs on WWE's social media platforms and their official website that covers stories, breaking news, previews of upcoming episodes of Raw and SmackDown, and event recaps. During her tenure, she contributed to Sam Roberts' show on Sirius XM.

On September 25, 2019, Kelley made her official television debut during an episode of NXT. She also made one night appearance on SmackDown as correspondent on November 1, 2019, after most of the WWE roster were stuck overseas.

On February 13, 2020, Kelley announced on social media that she was leaving WWE. Her last day with the company was at NXT TakeOver: Portland on February 16.

2020–2022: Acting, post-WWE projects 
In 2020, Kelley made her acting debut on the Netflix sitcom #blackAF as a flight attendant.

2022–present: Return to WWE 
On October 6, 2022, WWE announced that Kelley will be returning to the company as a backstage interviewer on the Raw brand.

Filmography

Television

References

External links 

1988 births
Living people
American television reporters and correspondents
American actresses
Actors from Oak Park, Illinois
Actresses from Illinois
Loyola University Chicago alumni
American people of Austrian descent
American people of Irish descent
Participants in American reality television series
American women television journalists
21st-century American women